Frederick Bidds "Happy" Iott (July 7, 1876 – February 17, 1941) was an American professional baseball center fielder. He played in Major League Baseball with the Cleveland Naps in 1903. He was born in Houlton, Maine, and pitched for the town team there. In 1897, he was on the Houlton team that won the state championship.

Known as "Happy Jack," Iott played professional baseball in the New England League in 1902 and 1903. In the latter season, he hit .317 for the Fall River Indians and won the league batting title. Iott was then acquired by the major league Cleveland Naps. He played three games for Cleveland from September 16 to September 18 and got 2 hits in 10 at bats.

Iott returned to Fall River in 1904 and also played in the Connecticut State League before retiring from baseball. He died in Island Falls, Maine, in 1941.

References

External links

1876 births
1941 deaths
Major League Baseball center fielders
Cleveland Naps players
Taunton Herrings players
Concord Marines players
Fall River Indians players
Holyoke Paperweights players
Baseball players from Maine
People from Houlton, Maine